Red Grey Blue is Mel Parsons' second album, released on 19 September 2011 on Cape Road Recordings. The album features Anika Moa and Greg Johnson on harmonies, Bruce Lynch on double bass, and Don McGlashan on baritone horn, along with others.  The album was recorded in Studio One, Boatshed Studios, and The Spare Room, in Auckland, New Zealand. The album was nominated for the Tui NZ Music Award's Folk Album of the Year. Parsons and her backing band the Rhythm Kings performed a 20 date New Zealand tour from 24 September 2011 to 5 November to showcase the album release.

Track list

Personnel

Musicians
 Mel Parsons – vocals, guitar
 Jeremy Toy - guitar
 Neil Watson - guitar
 Alistair Deverick - drums
 Paul Taylor - percussion
 Bruce Lynch - double bass
 Anika Moa - vocal harmony
 Greg Johnson - vocal harmony
 Anji Sami - vocal harmony
 Don McGlashan - baritone horn, euphonium

Production
 Mel Parsons - producer
 Jeremy Toy - producer
 Don Bartley – mastering
 Andre Upston - engineering
 Dylan Luc du Plessis - album cover design

Chart
{| class="wikitable"
!align="left"|Chart
!align="left"|Peak position
|-
|align="left"|NZ Top 40 Albums Chart
| style="text-align:center;"| 27
|-
|align="left"|Top 20 IMNZ Albums
| style="text-align:center;"| 8
|-
|}

References

2011 albums
Mel Parsons albums